Ta Erotika may refer to:

 Ta Erotika (Marinella album)
 Ta Erotika (Sakis Rouvas album)